Schinia cognata is a moth of the family Noctuidae. It is found in south-eastern Europe (from the Balkans to the Czech Republic and from Ukraine to France and Italy.) and Turkey.

The wingspan is 15–22 mm. Adults are on wing from June to July.

The larvae feed on Asteraceae species and are used as a biological control agent for Chondrilla juncea. They feed on the flower buds and flowers, completely destroying them and thus reducing the seed production and species distribution. The moth has several populations per year. Larvae are found in August and September.

References

External links

Moths and Butterflies of Europe and North Africa
Lepiforum.de

Moths described in 1833
Schinia
Moths of Europe
Moths of Asia
Taxa named by Christian Friedrich Freyer